The 1961 NBA draft was the 15th annual draft of the National Basketball Association (NBA). The draft was held on March 27, 1961, before the 1961–62 season. In this draft, nine NBA teams took turns selecting amateur U.S. college basketball players. A player who had finished his four-year college eligibility was eligible for selection. If a player left college early, he would not be eligible for selection until his college class graduated. In each round, the teams select in reverse order of their win–loss record in the previous season. Before the draft, a team could forfeit its first-round draft pick and then select any player from within a 50-mile radius of its home arena as their territorial pick. An expansion franchise, the Chicago Packers, were assigned the first pick of the first round and the last pick of each subsequent round, along with five extra picks at the end of the second round. The draft consisted of 15 rounds comprising 107 players selected.

Draft selections and draftee career notes
Walt Bellamy from the Indiana University was selected first overall by the Chicago Packers. Bellamy went on to win the Rookie of the Year Award in his first season and was also selected to the All-Star Game. In his rookie season, he averaged 31.6 points per game, the second highest scoring average for a rookie, and 19.0 rebounds per game, the third highest rebounding average for a rookie. He was selected to four consecutive All-Star Games during his stint with the Packers, which later became the Chicago Zephyrs and Baltimore Bullets. He then played for three other NBA teams during his 14-year career. For his achievements, he has been inducted to the Basketball Hall of Fame.

Three other players from this draft, 7th pick Tom Meschery, 21st pick Don Kojis and 32nd pick Bill Bridges, have also been selected to at least one All-Star Game. Doug Moe, the 22nd pick, never played in the NBA. His contract with the Packers was voided due to his suspected involvement in the college basketball point shaving scandal. He eventually played in the American Basketball Association (ABA) for five years. He won the ABA championship in 1969 and was selected to three ABA All-Star Games and two All-ABA Teams. After his playing career, he became a head coach. He coached four NBA teams and won the Coach of the Year Award in 1988 with the Denver Nuggets. Ray Scott, the 4th pick, played for the Detroit Pistons for five and a half seasons before he moved on to play with two other teams in the NBA and ABA. After retiring as a player in 1972, he immediately became a head coach. He coached the Pistons for three and a half seasons and won the Coach of the Year Award in 1974. Two other players drafted also went on to have a coaching career: 12th pick Johnny Egan and 60th pick Donnie Butcher.

Key

Draft

Other picks
The following list includes other draft picks who have appeared in at least one NBA game.

Notes

See also
 List of first overall NBA draft picks

References
General

Specific

External links
NBA.com
NBA.com: NBA Draft History

Draft
National Basketball Association draft
NBA draft
NBA draft
Basketball in New York City
Sporting events in New York City